Svetlana Gennadiyevna Chernigovskaya (born 14 April 1994) is a Russian sprint canoeist. She won two bronze medals in the Canoe Sprint European Championships in 2015 and 2018, both in the K4 500 m event.

References

External links

1994 births
Living people
People from Volzhsky, Volgograd Oblast
Russian female canoeists
Olympic canoeists of Russia
Canoeists at the 2020 Summer Olympics
European Games competitors for Russia
Canoeists at the 2015 European Games
Canoeists at the 2019 European Games
ICF Canoe Sprint World Championships medalists in kayak
Sportspeople from Volgograd Oblast
21st-century Russian women